James L. Pavitt (born February 19, 1946 - died December 22, 2022) was Deputy Director for Operations (DDO) for the CIA from 23 June 1999 until July 12, 2004, when he resigned a day after George Tenet. The CIA said the resignations was for personal reasons.

Background
Pavitt was born in St. Louis, Missouri and graduated from the University of Missouri (B.A., 1968) in Columbia, Missouri as a member of Phi Beta Kappa.  After graduation, he was a National Defense Education Act fellow at Clark University (1969). He is currently a Principal of The Scowcroft Group, an international business advisory firm, and was formerly on the board of the Association of Former Intelligence Officers (AFIO).

He was married with two children (from a previous marriage) and resided in McLean, Virginia.

His hobbies included collecting art, especially primitive American art.

Intelligence career
Pavitt served in the United States Army from 1969-1971 as an intelligence officer and was a legislative assistant with the House of Representatives from 1971 until 1973.

After joining the CIA, Pavitt was posted to Austria, Germany, Malaysia, and Luxembourg between 1976 and 1983.  He was expelled (PNG'd) from East Germany.  He was chief of station in Luxembourg (1983-1986).  He served as a Branch Chief in the Africa Division.  From 1990 to 1993, he served on the National Security Council team under Brent Scowcroft as Senior Intelligence Advisor to President George H. W. Bush.  After being assigned to work across the Agency operational/analytical divide in the Directorate of Intelligence, he became the founder and first Chief of the Directorate of Operation's Counterproliferation Division (CPD).  Gordon Oehler, then Chief of the Directorate of Intelligence's Non-Proliferation Center, criticized this as being redundant and stepping on his turf.  This was considered a specious critique by veteran Agency HUMINT Operations Officers, however, especially those who had been assigned under Oehler previously and realized that Oehler held HUMINT counterproliferation operations—indeed, covert operations in general—in considerable disdain.  Pavitt hand picked operations officers, some of which were Nonofficial Cover Officers (NOCs) including Valerie Plame, to staff the CPD.  In 1997 he was appointed Associate Deputy Director of Operations.  He was Deputy Director of Operations from 1999 until his resignation in 2004.  In 2003, the CPD took down the nuclear black market being operated by Abdul Qadeer Khan.

After September 11, 2001, Pavitt was responsible for sending Special Activities Division teams to Afghanistan, Pakistan, Indonesia, Thailand, and Somalia to capture Al Qaeda members.  The first Hellfire missiles fired from drones were under his command.  They were aimed at an Al Qaeda convoy in Sudan in which all occupants, including an American citizen, were killed.

In April 2004 he appeared before the 9/11 Commission. The BBC called his 9/11 commission appearance 'unprecedented'. The commission's report said that shortly after Bush's election, Pavitt told the President-elect that Osama bin Laden was one of the gravest threats to the country. He also added that killing the Al Qaeda leader would have an effect but not stop the threat posed by the terrorist organization.

When Bush put Porter Goss in charge of the agency, Pavitt reportedly opposed the internal reorganizations announced by Goss, on the ground that they might "do damage to a strategic effort that has produced excellent work on terrorism and a variety of other important issues." On June 4, 2004, he unexpectedly announced his retirement one day after George Tenet. The CIA said Pavitt's decision was unconnected with Tenet's departure. Pavitt was succeeded by his deputy, Stephen Kappes.  On June 21, 2004, Pavitt delivered one of his last speeches as DDO to the Foreign Policy Association. He resigned in July 12, 2004, one day after of Tenet's resignation.

Pavitt is a recipient of the CIA's Distinguished Intelligence Medal.  He is also a recipient of the CIA Distinguished Career Intelligence Medal, the CIA Director’s Medal and the Donovan Award.

Post-CIA work
He is an advisor to the Patriot Defense Group, LLC, to Olton Solutions Ltd. in the United Kingdom, and to The Scowcroft Group. He is a director of CACI International, Inc.

Criticism and controversy
Some former operations officers are critical of Pavitt, citing his four international postings over ten years in a 30-year career as insufficient experience for a Deputy Director of Operations. The Senate Intelligence Committee report on CIA torture found that Pavitt was told that rectal exams of at least two CIA prisoners had been conducted with "excessive force" but he took action to stop this behavior.

External links
 Appointment of James L. Pavitt as Special Assistant to the President for National Security Affairs, June 24, 1992
 Transcript: Wednesday's 9/11 Commission Hearings, The Washington Post, March 24, 2004
 In photos: Counterterrorism officials testify on IT challenges - Dan Verton of Computerworld, April 16, 2004
 Press Release: CIA Deputy Director for Operations Announces Retirement, ODCI, McLean, VA. June 4, 2004
 Ex-spy master praises CIAs effectiveness; MU graduate advises caution in revamping - Josh Flory  of Columbia Daily Tribune, October 9, 2004
 Ex-CIA Official Defends Detention Policies - Dana Priest of The Washington Post, October 27, 2004; Page A21
 Retired Official Defends the CIA's Performance - Dana Priest of The Washington Post, November 5, 2004; Page A23
 Goss pushes change at CIA - Bill Gertz of The Washington Times, November 19, 2004
 James L. Pavitt's Resume The Scowcroft Group

Speeches
 Address to Duke University Law School Conference Jim Pavitt, Deputy Director for Operations, April 11, 2002
 Remarks of Deputy Director of Operations James L. Pavitt on the 60th anniversary of the Office of Strategic Services, CIA's Predecessor, June 8, 2002
 Remarks by the Deputy Director for Operations James L. Pavitt at the American Bar Association Standing Committee on Law and National Security Breakfast Program, January 23, 2003
 Posted Written Statement for the Record of James L. Pavitt, Deputy Director for Operations, before the National Commission on Terrorist Attacks Upon the United States, April 14, 2004.
 Remarks by Deputy Director for Operations James L. Pavitt Foreign Policy Association, June 21, 2004
 America's Clandestine Service Foreign Policy Association, June 21, 2004

References

1946 births
Living people
People from St. Louis
People from McLean, Virginia
People of the Central Intelligence Agency
University of Missouri alumni
United States Army officers
Recipients of the Distinguished Intelligence Medal